Scott A. Thomson is an Australian herpetologist, paleontologist, and taxonomist, specialising in turtles of the family Chelidae.

Education
Thomson attended the University of Canberra for both his bachelor's and master's degrees in applied sciences, studying zoology and mathematics.

Career
Thomson is a researcher at the Museum of Zoology of the University of São Paulo and curator at the Chelonian Research Institute in Oviedo, Florida. He is active in resolving nomenclatural issues, a member of the Tortoise and Freshwater Turtle Specialist Group of the IUCN's Species Survival Commission, and co-author of the 2015 checklist of extinct Pleistocene and Holocene turtles. Thomson advocates for science-based rather than political- or conservation-driven taxonomy.

Thomson has described several extant and fossil turtles, including:
 Chelodina burrungandjii Thomson, Kennett, and Georges 2000 – Arnhem snake-necked turtle, sandstone snake-necked turtle
 Chelodina canni McCord and Thomson 2002 – Cann's snake-necked turtle
 Chelodina (Chelydera) Thomson and Georges 2020
 Elseya (Hanwarachelys) Thomson et al. 2015
 Elseya albagula Thomson, Georges, and Limpus 2006 – white-throated snapping turtle, southern snapping turtle
 Elseya flaviventralis Thomson and Georges 2016 – yellow-bellied snapping turtle
 †Elseya nadibajagu Thomson and Mackness 1999 – ancient snapping turtle
 Elseya rhodini Thomson et al. 2015 – southern New Guinea stream turtle, Rhodin's stream turtle
 Myuchelys Thomson and Georges 2009
 †Rheodytes devisi Thomson 2000 – DeVis' river diver

References

External links

 Thomson's website

Living people
Australian taxonomists
Australian herpetologists
Australian paleontologists
1966 births